Austromorium hetericki is an Australian species of ant in the genus Austromorium. It is only found in Western Australia. Little is known about their biology.

References

Myrmicinae
Insects described in 2009
Hymenoptera of Australia